Frane Perišin (born 13 July 1960) is a Croatian actor.

Filmography

Television roles

Movie roles

External links

Notes

1960 births
Living people
Actors from Split, Croatia
20th-century Croatian male actors
21st-century Croatian male actors
Croatian male stage actors
Croatian male film actors
Croatian male television actors